The Olympian is a newspaper based in Olympia, Washington, in the United States.

History

Olympia was home to the first newspaper to be published in modern-day Washington, The Columbian, which published its first edition on September 11, 1852.

The Olympian started in 1860 as The Washington Standard, a weekly paper. It was founded by John Miller Murphy, and its first issue was released on November 17, 1860. The paper became The Daily Olympian in February 1889 when it began publishing daily. Many people in Olympia still refer to The Olympian by its former name, or as "The Daily O."

The Daily Olympian and another Olympia newspaper, The Daily Recorder, merged in 1928. The Daily Olympian moved from its original home, on Legion Way and Washington Street, to the Capitol Press Building at the corner of Capitol Way and State Avenue.

The Gannett Company purchased The Daily Olympian in 1971 and shortened its name to The Olympian in 1982. The Olympian moved to its current location at 111 Bethel Street in 1972.

In September 2005, The Olympian was traded by Gannett Company, Inc., along with the Bellingham and Boise newspapers, to Knight Ridder in exchange for the Tallahassee Democrat.

The Olympian now shares much of its operations—including printing—with The News Tribune, a McClatchy newspaper located in Tacoma. However, the newspaper's editor and reporters still work out of the Olympia office on Bethel Street.

In June 2017, The Olympian announced that it would move to an office in downtown Olympia, on the corner of Legion Way and Franklin Street. The building on Bethel Street will soon be occupied by the Olympia School District.

Olympics trademark dispute

McClatchy submitted a trademark application for The Olympian in 2006, which was disputed by the United States Olympic Committee under the terms of the Amateur Sports Act of 1978. The law was amended in 1998 to protect businesses and services in Washington state that were not named for the Olympic Games, but rather the geographic locations sharing the name. The United States Patent and Trademark Office granted The Olympian its requested trademark in 2011.

See also
 
 
 History of Olympia

References

External links
 TheOlympian.com
 Official mobile website

Mass media in Olympia, Washington
McClatchy publications
Newspapers published in Washington (state)